In March 2010, members from the EPP, S&D, ALDE, Greens/EFA and ECR groups founded the “Friends of Turkey” group in the European Parliament. Seventy-seven MEPs joined and were active members during the 7th legislative term (2009-2014). Alojz Peterle (EPP) was elected as chairman of the group.	

In September 2014, the group was successfully re-launched. Artis Pabriks (EPP) and Ismail Ertug (S&D) became the new co-chairs.

The main objective of the informal group is to closely monitor EU accession negotiations with Turkey from a critical but constructive approach. Friends of Turkey is conceived as a platform for discussion where MEPs can contribute to the improvement of EU-Turkey relations.

As a cross-party informal group, Friends of Turkey has successfully positioned itself at the core of the debate on EU-Turkey negotiations. The group organizes formal and informal meetings with European and Turkish officials and it has served as a platform for high-level discussions including all the different actors involved in EU-Turkey relations.

Laura Batalla Adam is the current Secretary General of the group.

Members 
Group of the Progressive Alliance of Socialists and Democrats in the European Parliament (S&D)

Victor BOŞTINARU; Nessa CHILDERS; Ole CHRISTENSEN; Véronique DE KEYSER; Ismail ERTUG; Tanja FAJON; Knut FLECKENSTEIN; Richard HOWITT; Liisa JAAKONSAARI; Jo LEINEN; Bogusław LIBERADZKI; Claude MORAES; Norbert NEUSER; Pavel POC; Jutta STEINRUCK; Boris ZALA

European Conservatives and Reformists Group (ECR)

Sajjad KARIM; Geoffrey VAN ORDEN; Jan ZAHRADIL

Group of the Alliance of Liberals and Democrats for Europe (ALDE)

Sophie IN’T VELD; Anneli JÄÄTTEENMÄKI; Gesine MEISSNER; Alexandra THEIN; Michael THEURER; Ivo VAJGL;

Confederal Group of the European United Left – Nordic Green Left (GUE/NGL)

Group of the Greens/European Free Alliance (Greens/EFA)

Jan Philipp ALBRECHT; Karima DELLI; Heidi HAUTALA; Ska KELLER; Indrek TARAND

References

External links
 

Intergroups in the European Parliament
Turkey–European Union relations